Zlatko Mašek (31 October 1928 – 20 September 1993) was a Yugoslav sports shooter. He competed at the 1952 Summer Olympics and 1956 Summer Olympics.

References

1928 births
1993 deaths
Yugoslav male sport shooters
Olympic shooters of Yugoslavia
Shooters at the 1952 Summer Olympics
Shooters at the 1956 Summer Olympics
Place of birth missing